Vesna Dekleva Paoli (born 6 April 1975) is a Slovenian sailor. She competed at three Olympics: in 1996, 2004, and 2008. Her best result was at the 2004 Summer Olympics where she finished fourth.

References

External links
 
 Vesna Dekleva Paoli at SailRacer
 
 

1975 births
Living people
Slovenian female sailors (sport)
Olympic sailors of Slovenia
Sailors at the 1996 Summer Olympics – Europe
Sailors at the 2004 Summer Olympics – 470
Sailors at the 2008 Summer Olympics – 470
21st-century Slovenian women